Events in the year 1954 in Brazil.

Incumbents

Federal government
 President: Getúlio Vargas (until August 24); Café Filho (starting August 24)
 Vice President: Café Filho (until August 24); vacant (starting August 24)

Governors 
 Alagoas: Arnon de Mello 
 Amazonas: Álvaro Botelho Maia 
 Bahia: Régis Pacheco 
 Ceará: Raul Barbosa (from 1 July) Stênio Gomes da Silva (until 31 July)
 Espírito Santo: Francisco Alves Ataíde
 Goiás: Pedro Ludovico Teixeira 
 Maranhão: 
 Mato Grosso: Fernando Corrêa da Costa
 Minas Gerais: Juscelino Kubitschek 
 Pará: Zacarias de Assumpção 
 Paraíba: José Américo de Almeida 
 Paraná: Bento Munhoz da Rocha Neto
 Pernambuco: Etelvino Lins de Albuquerque 
 Piauí: Pedro Freitas 
 Rio de Janeiro: Amaral Peixoto                                                      
 Rio Grande do Norte: Silvio Piza Pedrosa 
 Rio Grande do Sul: Ildo Meneghetti 
 Santa Catarina: Irineu Bornhausen 
 São Paulo: Lucas Nogueira Garcez 
 Sergipe: Arnaldo Rollemberg Garcez

Vice governors
 Alagoas: Antônio Guedes de Miranda 
 Ceará: Stênio Gomes da Silva (until 30 June)
 Espírito Santo: Francisco Alves Ataíde
 Goiás: Jonas Ferreira Alves Duarte (until 1 July)
 Maranhão: Renato Bayma Archer da Silva
 Mato Grosso: João Leite de Barros 
 Minas Gerais: Clóvis Salgado da Gama 
 Paraíba: João Fernandes de Lima 
 Piauí: Tertuliano Milton Brandão (until 25 March) Francisco Ferreira de Castro (from 25 March)
 Rio de Janeiro: Tarcísio Miranda (until 25 March); Roberto Silveira (from 25 March)
 Rio Grande do Norte: vacant 
 São Paulo: Erlindo Salzano (until 31 January); Porfírio da Paz (from 31 January)
 Sergipe: Edelzio Vieira de Melo

Events
October 3 - Brazilian legislative election, 1954

Births
20 May - João Batista Nunes, footballer
28 May - João Carlos de Oliveira, athlete
2 June 
Diana, singer
Mattos Nascimento, trombonist
28 June - Daniel Dantas, actor
24 December - Luís Carlos Melo Lopes, footballer
25 December - João Justino Amaral dos Santos, footballer

Deaths
August 24 - Getúlio Vargas, suicide

References

See also 
1954 in Brazilian football
List of Brazilian films of 1954

 
1950s in Brazil
Years of the 20th century in Brazil
Brazil
Brazil